Mays Business School is the business school at Texas A&M University. The school educates more than 6,400 undergraduate, master’s and doctoral students in accounting, finance, management, management information systems, marketing and supply chain management.

Mays Business School was one of the first five schools in the United States to offer a trading center, the Reliant Energy Securities & Commodities Trading Center, which provides students with hands-on training to the tools used by commodities and currency traders. Students also use the center to manage the Tanner Fund, a $250,000 portfolio created using donated funds. Additionally, the School houses the nation's largest publicly funded real estate research organization, the Real Estate Center, and the Center for Retailing Studies, which was the first retailing center partnered with a business school.

History

Business education was first offered at Texas Agricultural and Mechanical College in conjunction with mechanical and agricultural programs. From 1876 through 1920 students at Texas A&M could select from a small number of business courses including single and double-entry bookkeeping and creamery management. In the 1920s the Department of Economics and the Agricultural Administration programs began offering further business courses, and by the end of the decade the college had established departments for accounting and statistics, farm and ranch management, marketing, and finance.

Shortly after World War II, Thomas W. Leland became the first department head of the newly created Department of Business and Accounting, under the umbrella of the School of Arts and Sciences. After Leland's retirement in 1961, the School of Business Administration formed. By 1965 the new head of the department, John E. Pearson, had spearheaded the formation of several departments within the School of Business, including accounting, business analysis and research, finance, marketing, and management. The Master of Business Administration (MBA) program debuted in 1966, and two years later in 1968, the college was officially formed when Texas A&M received University status, and the School of Business became the College of Business Administration.
The college was accredited by the American Assembly of Collegiate Schools of Business in 1972, and began awarding Ph.D.s the same year. Over the next several decades the college continued to grow, establishing various centers, including the Center for International Business Studies and the Center for Human Resources Management, and implementing new bachelor's degrees.

The College of Business moved into the newly built Wehner Building on the western edge of Texas A&M University's campus in 1995. The following year the College was endowed by Lowry Mays, founder of Clear Channel Communications, and in his honor was renamed Lowry Mays College & Graduate School of Business. Six-years later, the name was simplified to Mays Business School. Expansion continued quickly, and in 2003 an additional wing was added to the Wehner Building, housing the new  Jerry and Kay Cox Graduate Business Center.

Academics

The business school is subdivided into five academic departments: accounting, finance, information & operations management, management, and marketing.

Research Centers
Center for Executive Development (CED)
Center for Human Resource Management (CHRM)
Center for International Business Studies (CIBS)
Center for the Management of Information Systems (CMIS)
McFerrin Center for Entrepreneurship 
Center for Retailing Studies (CRS)
Real Estate Center (REC)
Reliant Energy Trading Center (RTC)

Notable faculty 
 Leonard Berry, Distinguished Professor of Marketing
 R. Duane Ireland, University Distinguished Professor of Management
 Eli Jones, Professor of Marketing
 Venkatesh Shankar, Professor of Marketing

Notable alumni
 Cigna COO and President David Cordani '88
 Humana CEO and President Bruce Broussard '84
 Halliburton CEO, President, and Chairman of the Board Jeff Miller (American businessman) '88
 New Orleans Saints Head Coach Dennis Allen (American football)
 Permanent University Fund (UTIMCO) Chief Investment Officer, Teacher Retirement System of Texas Chief Investment Officer, Bridgewater Associates former CEO Thomas Britton Harris IV '80
 Koch Industries Co-Owner, CEO, and Chairman Chase Koch
 Kinder Morgan CEO Kim Dang '92
 Waste Management CFO and Executive Vice President Devina Rankin '89

Notable Organizations 

 Business Student Council
 Founded in 1968. BSC is responsible for some of the largest events and projects at Texas A&M, including Maysfest, the Business Career Fair, Mays Exchange apparel sales. 
 Functions as an umbrella organization between the Dean's office and the other student organizations at Mays Business School. 
 Aggie Investment Club
 Founded in 2000. Largest student organization at Mays Business School and fifth largest at Texas A&M University, averaging 1,000 members per year.
 Membership is open to undergraduate and graduate students in all majors.
 Known for Speaker Series, Security Analysis Workshops, and Travel Series which has included meetings with Warren Buffett, George Mitchell, Sam Zell, and Lee Bass; among others.

Notable Programs 

 Aggies on Wall Street
 The Tanner Fund
Titans of Investing
 Professional Program of Accounting (PPA)
 Trading, Risk, and Investments Program (TRIP)

See also
List of United States business school rankings
List of business schools in the United States

References

External links
 

Texas A&M University colleges and schools
Business schools in Texas
Educational institutions established in 1961
The Washington Campus
1961 establishments in Texas